is Japanese singer Maaya Sakamoto's 14th single. "Saigo no Kajitsu" was featured as the ending theme for the Tsubasa Chronicle OVA Tokyo Revelations. When writing "Saigo no Kajitsu", Sakamoto described Syaoran's fate as sad because he becomes the antagonist of his friends and is a clone.

Track listing

Charts

References

2007 singles
2007 songs
Maaya Sakamoto songs
Songs written by Maaya Sakamoto
Victor Entertainment singles
Anime songs
Tsubasa: Reservoir Chronicle